Benthofascis biconica is a species of sea snail, a marine gastropod mollusk in the family Conorbidae.

These snails are predatory and venomous. They are capable of "stinging" humans, therefore live ones should be handled carefully or not at all.

Description
The length of an adult shell varies between 20 mm and 42 mm. The diameter of the holotype is 8 mm.

(Original description) The solid shell has a biconical shape. It is slightly angled at the shoulder. The shell contains more than six whorls (the shell is too worn in order to describe the protoconch). The colour of the shell is apparently flesh-tint. Below the shoulder the shell is furrowed by numerous fine spiral grooves, crossed by arcuate growth lines. Above the furrows are broader and fewer. The aperture is narrow. The sinus is sutural and deep. The outer lip (broken in my example) appears to have curved far forward. The columella is angled in the centre, spreading broadly and with a small anterior plication.

Distribution
This marine species is endemic to Australia and occurs off New South Wales.

References

 Hedley, C. 1922. A revision of the Australian Turridae. Records of the Australian Museum 13(6): 213–359, pls 42–56
 Laseron, C. 1954. Revision of the New South Wales Turridae (Mollusca). Australian Zoological Handbook. Sydney : Royal Zoological Society of New South Wales 1–56, pls 1–12.
 Powell, A.W.B. 1968. The Turrid shellfish of Australian waters. Australian Natural History 1 16: 1–6
 Wilson, B. 1994. Australian Marine Shells. Prosobranch Gastropods. Kallaroo, WA : Odyssey Publishing Vol. 2 370 pp.

External links
 

biconica
Gastropods of Australia